Samy Sana (born 10 December 1988) is an Algerian-French Muay Thai kickboxer and Mixed martial artist. He is the former WBC Muaythai Interim Super Middleweight champion and fought in ONE Championship.

In August 2020, he was ranked the #7 lightweight in the world by Combat Press.

Biography and career

Early career
On 16 June 2013, Samy Sana won the Wicked One Tournament in the 70 kg light middleweight division by defeating Guimba Coulibaly by knockout and Kevin Renahy by decision in one night.

On 4 October 2013, for the A1 World Middleweight Championship, Sana lost to Tass Tsitsiras in Springvale, Australia, by DQ, after a knee illegally struck Tsitsiras in the throat. Tsitsiras could no longer continue. It was ruled a disqualification.

At the "Best of Siam" event held at Rajadamnern Stadium on 27 May 2016, Sana defeated Eakchanachai Kaewsamrit via third-round knockout to win the WBC Muaythai World Super Middleweight (75 kg) Championship.

Samy Sana defeated Fernando Calzetta at the joint event between Oktagon and Bellator on 9 December 2017 to win the ISKA Muay Thai World Middleweight (72.5 kg) Championship.

On 17 March 2018, Samy Sana defeated both Kevin Renahy and Zakaria Laaouatni in the same night in Tours, France to win the "La Nuit Des Titans" 72.5 kg middleweight tournament.

ONE Championship
Samy Sana made his ONE Championship debut on 29 June 2018 at ONE Championship: Spirit of a Warrior in Yangon, Myanmar, where he lost to Sorgraw Petchyindee by unanimous decision. He then defeated Armen Petrosyan by unanimous decision at ONE Championship: Conquest of Champions in Manila on 23 November 2018. Next, he lost to Jo Nattawut by unanimous decision at ONE Championship: Clash of Legends in Bangkok on 16 February 2019.

ONE Featherweight Kickboxing World Grand Prix
Sana was announced as one of the participants in the ONE Super Series Featherweight Kickboxing World Grand Prix, which included Giorgio Petrosyan, Yodsanklai Fairtex, and Phetmorakot Petchyindee Academy. In the Grand Prix Quarter-Final, which took place at ONE Championship: Enter the Dragon in Kallang, Singapore on 17 May 2019, he upset Yodsanklai Fairtex in a three-round unanimous decision victory which saw him knock down Yodsanklai. His win over Yodsanklai was voted the "Upset of the Year" by Combat Press.

After his upset win over Yodsanklai, he was scheduled to face Dzhabar Askerov in the Grand Prix Semi-Final at ONE Championship: Dreams of Gold in Bangkok on 16 August 2019, where he went on to win by majority decision in a fight that saw Sana scoring a knockdown on Askerov.

He is scheduled to face Giorgio Petrosyan in the Featherweight Kickboxing World Grand Prix Final at ONE Championship: Century in Tokyo on 13 October 2019. On 13 October 2019, Samy Sana lost to Giorgio Petrosyan in the Kickboxing World Grand Prix Final by unanimous decision.

Following his run in the Featherweight Grand Prix, Sana was one of four French kickboxers to enter the ONE Championship rankings.

Post-Grand Prix
He returned to action at S47S, when he fought Martin Meoni. Sana won the fight by unanimous decision.

Samy Sana was scheduled to fight at ONE Championship: Collision Course 2 on 25 December 2020, where faced Jamal Yusupov. Both fighters held upset victories over Yodsanklai Fairtex. In a fight that saw him get knocked down in the second round, Sana lost by unanimous decision.

2021 Kickboxing Grand Prix
On 3 September 2021, it was announced that Sana would be one of eight participants in the 2021 ONE Kickboxing Featherweight Grand Prix. He will face Chingiz Allazov at ONE Championship: First Strike. Sana lost the fight in 39 seconds via liver punch, suffering the first knockout loss of his career.

Titles and achievements
ONE Championship
2019 ONE Kickboxing Featherweight World Grand Prix Runner-up 
 Nuit des Titans
 2018 Nuit des Titans Tournament Champion (-72.5 kg)
 International Sport Karate Association
 2017 ISKA World Muay Thai Championship (-72.5 kg)
 WBC Muay Thai
 2016 W.B.C. Interim Super Middlweight Championship (-75 kg)
 Wicked One
 2013 Wicked One Tournament Champion (-71 kg).
 Fédération française de kick boxing, muay thaï et disciplines associées
 2012 French Muay Thai Champion (-71 kg)
 2011 French Muay Thai Champion (-71 kg)
 Combat Press
 2019 Upset of the Year

Mixed martial arts record

|-
|
|align=center|
|Expedito Valin
|
|Ares FC 12
|
|align=center|
|align=center|
|Paris, France
|-

Muay Thai & Kickboxing record 

|- style="background:#fbb;"
| 2021-10-15|| Loss ||align=left| Chingiz Allazov || ONE Championship: First Strike || Kallang, Singapore || KO (Punch to the Body) || 1 || 0:39 
|-
! style=background:white colspan=9 |
|-
|-   style="background:#fbb;"
| 2020-12-25 || Loss ||align=left| Jamal Yusupov || ONE Championship: Collision Course 2  || Kallang, Singapore || Decision (Unanimous) || 3 || 3:00
|-   style="background:#cfc;"
| 2020-10-03 || Win ||align=left| Martin Meoni || S47S  || Paris, France || Decision (Unanimous) || 3 || 3:00
|-
|-   style="background:#fbb;"
| 2019-10-13 || Loss ||align=left| Giorgio Petrosyan || ONE Championship: Century  || Tokyo, Japan || Decision (Unanimous) || 3 || 3:00
|-
! align="center" style="background:white" colspan=8 | 
|-   style="background:#cfc;"
| 2019-08-16 || Win ||align=left| Dzhabar Askerov || ONE Championship: Dreams of Gold  || Bangkok, Thailand || Decision (Majority) || 3 || 3:00
|-
! align="center" style="background:white" colspan=8 | 
|-   style="background:#cfc;"
| 2019-05-17 || Win ||align=left| Yodsanklai Fairtex || ONE Championship: Enter the Dragon || Kallang, Singapore || Decision (Unanimous) || 3 || 3:00
|-
! style="background:white" colspan=8 | 
|-  style="background:#fbb;"
| 2019-02-16 || Loss ||align=left| Jo Nattawut || ONE Championship: Clash of Legends || Bangkok, Thailand || Decision (Unanimous) || 3 || 3:00
|-  style="background:#cfc;"
| 2018-11-23 || Win ||align=left| Armen Petrosyan || ONE Championship: Conquest of Champions || Manila, Philippines || Decision (Unanimous) || 3 || 3:00
|-  style="background:#fbb;"
| 2018-06-29 || Loss ||align=left| Sorgraw Petchyindee || ONE Championship: Spirit of a Warrior || Yangon, Myanmar || Decision (Unanimous) || 3 || 3:00
|-  style="background:#cfc;"
| 2018-03-17 || Win ||align=left| Zakaria Laaouatni || La Nuit Des Titans || Tours, France || Decision|| 3 || 3:00
|-
! align="center" style="background:white" colspan=8 | 
|-  style="background:#cfc;"
| 2018-03-17 || Win ||align=left| Kevin Renahy || La Nuit Des Titans || Tours, France || Decision|| 3 ||  3:00
|-
! align="center" style="background:white" colspan=8 | 
|-  style="background:#cfc;"
| 2018-02-24 || Win ||align=left| Rashid Salikhov || ACB KB 13: From Paris with war || Paris, France || Decision (Unanimous) || 3 || 3:00
|-  style="background:#cfc;"
| 2017-12-09 || Win ||align=left| Fernando Calzetta || Oktagon Bellator || Florence, Italie || Decision|| 3 ||  3:00
|-
! align="center" style="background:white" colspan=8 | 
|-  style="background:#c5d2ea"
| 2017-10-28 || Draw ||align=left| Alka Matewa || Duel 2 || Paris, France || Draw  || 3 || 3:00
|-  style="background:#cfc;"
| 2017-07-17 || Win ||align=left| Saro Presti || Le Choc Des Gladiateurs || Lavandou, France || Decision (Unanimous) || 3 || 3:00
|-  style="background:#cfc;"
| 2017-02-25 || Win ||align=left| Ramon Kubler || Ilyrian Fight Night II || Winterthour, Switzerland || TKO (Doctor Stoppage) || 2 || 3:00
|-  style="background:#cfc;"
| 2016-05-27 || Win ||align=left| Eakchanachai Kaewsamrit || Best of Siam Rajadamnern || Bangkok, Thailand || KO (Punch) || 3 || 2:15
|-
! align="center" style="background:white" colspan=8 | 
|-  style="background:#c5d2ea"
| 2015-10-25 || Draw ||align=left| Nontachai Sitsae || Max Muay Thai Pattaya – 73 kg|| Pattaya, Thailand || Decision || 3 || 3:00
|-  style="background:#cfc;"
| 2015-06-19 || Win ||align=left| Raphaël Llodra || Best of Siam 6 || Paris, France || Decision || 5 || 3:00
|-  style="background:#fbb;"
| 2015-01-31 || Loss ||align=left| Diesellek TopkingBoxing || Emperor Chok Dee || Nancy, France || Decision || 5 || 3:00
|-  style="background:#fbb;"
| 2014-08-16 || Loss ||align=left| Thongchai Sitsongpeenong || 2014 TopKing World Series 2|| Saint-Quentin-en-Yvelines, France || Decision || 3 || 3:00
|-  style="background:#fbb;"
| 2014-08-16 || Loss ||align=left| Yohan Lidon || 2014 A1 WCC -75 kg/165 lb K1 rules || Lyon, France || Decision || 3 || 3:00
|-  style="background:#fbb;"
| 2014-08-16 || Loss ||align=left| Sudsakorn Sor Klinmee || 2014 Thai Fight -72.5 kg/154 lb Kard Chuek Fight || Nakan Sawan || Decision || 3 || 3:00
|-  style="background:#fbb;"
| 2014-07-26 || Loss ||align=left| Walid Haddad || Le Choc des Gladiateurs XIII || France || Decision || 3 || 3:00
|-  style="background:#cfc;"
| 2014-06-14 || Win ||align=left| Yodpayak Sitsongpeenong || Best Of Siam 5 || Paris, France || Décision || 5 || 3:00
|-  style="background:#cfc;"
| 2014-05-17 || Win ||align=left| Ibrahima Njie Jarra || Impact Fight Night -72.5 kg/154 lb || Bordeaux, France || Décision || 3 || 3:00
|-  style="background:#cfc;"
| 2014-03-08 || Win ||align=left| Armin Pumpanmuang Windy Sport || Le Choc des Légendes || Saint-Ouen, France || KO || 5 || 3:00
|-  style="background:#cfc;"
| 2014-02-15 || Win ||align=left| Youssef Sid || Wicked One Tournament -70 kg/154 lb Tournament, Finals || Paris, France || Decision || 5 || 3:00
|-  style="background:#fbb;"
| 2013-11-30 || Loss ||align=left| Yodsanklai Fairtex || 2013 Thai Fight -70 kg/154 lb Tournament, Semi Finals || Bangkok || Decision || 3 || 3:00
|-  style="background:#cfc;"
| 2013-11-15 || Win ||align=left| Wannamoon Nuttapong || Muay Thai League Paris Carpentier || Paris, France || KO || 5 || 3:00
|-  style="background:#cfc;"
| 2013-10-23 || Win ||align=left| Chike Lindsay || 2013 Thai Fight -70 kg/154 lb Tournament, Quarter Finals|| Bangkok || Décision || 3 || 3:00
|-  style="background:#fbb;"
| 2013-10-04 || Loss ||align=left| Tass Tsitsiras || A1 World Middleweight Title || Springvale, Australia || DQ (Throat Strike) || 1 ||
|-  style="background:#cfc;"
| 2013-06-16 || Win ||align=left| Kevin Renahy || Wicked One Tournament -70 kg/154 lb Tournament, Semi Finals || Paris, France || Decision || 3 || 3:00
|-  style="background:#cfc;"
| 2013-06-16 || Win ||align=left| Guimba Coulibaly || Wicked One Tournament -70 kg/154 lb Tournament, Quarter Finals || Paris, France || KO || 3 || 3:00
|-  style="background:#cfc;"
| 2013-05-04 || Win ||align=left| Elias Achergui || La Nuit des Combattants 3 || Persan (Val-d'Oise), France || KO || 5 || 3:00
|-  style="background:#cfc;"
| date|2013-03-30 || Win ||align=left| Sébastien Billard || Gala Méru || Méru, France || KO || 5 || 3:00
|-  style="background:#c5d2ea"
| 2013-03-09 || Draw ||align=left| Moussa Dembélé || Pantin Muay Thaï 2 || Pantin, France || Decision || 5 || 3:00
|-  style="background:#cfc;"
| 2013-02-15 || Win ||align=left| Farid El Bannoudi || Show Thaï 6 || Aubervilliers, France || Decision || 5 || 3:00
|-  style="background:#fbb;"
| 2012-12-15 || Loss ||align=left| Michal Krcmar || Vecer Bojovniku Thajskeho Boxu 4 || Prague, Czech Republic || Decision || 5 || 3:00
|-  style="background:#fbb;"
| 2012-10-20 || Loss ||align=left| Karim Bezzouh || Golden Fight || La Courneuve, France || Decision || 5 || 3:00
|-  style="background:#fbb;"
| 2012-10-06 || Loss ||align=left| Jan Mazur || Noc Bojov 3 || Orava, Slovakia || Decision || 3 || 3:00
|-  style="background:#cfc;"
| 2012-09-22 || Win ||align=left| Uno Karaoglan || Superpro Fight Night 4 || Basel, Switzerland || Decision || 3 || 3:00
|-  style="background:#cfc;"
| 2012-09-22 || Win ||align=left| Claudio Baressi || Superpro Fight Night 4 || Basel, Switzerland || Decision || 3 || 3:00
|-  style="background:#cfc;"
| 2012-03-03|| Win ||align=left| Kevin Martens || Shock Muay Thaï 4 || Saint-Denis, France || Décision || 5 || 3:00
|-  style="background:#cfc;"
| 2011-05-07 || Win ||align=left| Amine Bouhannani || Thai Max 2 || Palavas-les-Flots, France || KO || 5 || 3:00
|-  style="background:#cfc;"
| 2011-02-26|| Win ||align=left| Anthony Valle || Thai Max || Palavas-les-Flots, France || KO || 5 || 3:00
|-
|-
| colspan=9 | Legend:

See also
 List of male kickboxers
 List of WBC Muaythai world champions

References

External links

 Samy Sana at ONE Championship
 
 Samy Sana at MuayThaiTV.com

1988 births
French male kickboxers
Algerian male kickboxers
French Muay Thai practitioners
Living people
ONE Championship kickboxers
French sportspeople of Algerian descent